Saphobius is a genus of dung beetles in the tribe Deltochilini of the subfamily Scarabaeinae. They are endemic to New Zealand, with Saphobius edwardsi being most widespread. They are small in size, flightless, forest dwelling and nocturnal, which is unusual for dung beetles.

Dung beetles are typically associated with mammal faeces, but prior to human habitation, New Zealand lacked land mammals other than three species of bats. This lack of mammal faeces has been suggested as the reason for the low diversity of dung beetles in New Zealand when compared to the rest of the world. Olfaction studies and pitfall trap baiting trials have shown that chicken carcasses and squid are highly attractive to Saphobius, which may reflect the evolution of the genus on an island abundant with bird species, in particular sea birds.

Taxonomy 
The New Zealand Organisms Register lists these species.
 Saphobius brouni 
 Saphobius curvipes 
 Saphobius edwardsi 
 Saphobius fulvipes 
 Saphobius fuscus 
 Saphobius inflatipes 
 Saphobius laticollis 
 Saphobius lepidus 
 Saphobius lesnei 
 Saphobius nitidulus 
 Saphobius setosus 
 Saphobius squamulosus 
 Saphobius tibialis 
 Saphobius wakefieldi

References 

Beetles of New Zealand
Endemic fauna of New Zealand
Scarabaeidae genera
Deltochilini
Endemic insects of New Zealand